Fossil Springs Wilderness is an 11,550-acre (4,674 ha) wilderness area within the Coconino National Forest in the U.S. state of Arizona.  It is at the bottom of a steep canyon at the edge of the Colorado Plateau, just south of the Mogollon Rim.  Here, water emerges at the surface at the rate of about 2,700 cubic feet (76 m3) per minute.  The perennial water supply supports one of the most diverse riparian ecosystems in the state, with more than 30 species of trees set among native desert shrub. It also creates a haven for abundant wildlife, including elk, deer, javelina, coyote, skunk, racoon,  ring-tailed cat, fox, mountain lion, black bear and more than 100 species of birds.

See also
 Fossil Creek
 List of U.S. Wilderness Areas
 List of Arizona Wilderness Areas
 Wilderness Act

References

External links
 Fossil Springs Wilderness – Coconino National Forest

Mogollon Rim
Protected areas of Coconino County, Arizona
Protected areas of Yavapai County, Arizona
Wilderness areas of Arizona
Coconino National Forest